The  is a Japanese festival that takes place every year during Japan's Golden Week on May 4 and 5 at Tado Shrine in the city of Kuwana, Mie Prefecture.

Event description
The main event for the festival is a horse jumping event. The horses are ridden by young males around the ages of 17–19 representing the six sections of the city. The horses run up a hill before trying to jump over a two-meter high wall. On the first day, each area's representative jumps over the wall twice for a total of 12 jumps. On the second day, each representative only makes one attempt for a total of six jumps. Other events follow the horse jumping on the second day, including yabusame, a form of archery.

This event was named one of Mie Prefecture's Designated Intangible Cultural Properties in 1978.

On 2020 to 2022, this traditional festival was complete suspended, due privent to COVID-19 pandemic worldwide, since 1571, when lost caught fire to temple.

External links
Tado Shrine homepage 
Kuwana Sightseeing Guide: Tado Matsuri 

Festivals in Japan
Shinto festivals
Japanese culture
Festivals in Mie Prefecture